Oyan is a small city in Odo Otin North Local Council Development Authority in Osun State, Nigeria. The traditional title of the king is His Royal Majesty (HRM) Oloyan of Oyan, there are 4 prominent ruling houses in oyan,  they include;  Elemo's compound, Lajojo's compound, Daodu's compound and olomooba's compound.

Oyan situated between latitudes 8.031089 and 8.060466 N and longitude 4.742298 and 4.781107 E of the Greenwich meridian. Its postal code is 231107.

References

Populated places in Osun State